Santa Marta Bay is a bay located in the Caribbean Sea, in northern Magdalena Department of Colombia. Its waters bathe the city of Santa Marta, the country's second port in the Caribbean.

In the vicinity of the bay is the Sierra Nevada de Santa Marta, which is the highest intertropical mountain in the world by the sea.

References

Bays of Colombia
Bays of the Caribbean
Geography of Magdalena Department
Santa Marta